Lisa Antl (born 21 June 2000) is a German female handball player for Buxtehuder SV and the German national team.

She represented Germany at the 2021 World Women's Handball Championship in Spain.

References

External links

2000 births
Living people
Sportspeople from Ingolstadt
German female handball players
21st-century German women